Robert Neil Stinson (December 17, 1959 – February 18, 1995) was an American musician best known as a founding member and lead guitarist of the American rock band The Replacements.

Biography

Early life 
Bob Stinson was born on December 17, 1959 in Waconia, Minnesota to Neil and Anita Stinson. They divorced when he was two years old. His father was largely absent from his life, and he was raised by his mother. His half-brother Tommy Stinson was born nearly seven years later.  Despite Tommy's father being Anita's longtime boyfriend, Tommy was still given the last name "Stinson" by his mother. The pair also had two sisters, Lonnie and Lisa.

The Replacements (1979–1986)

Stinson formed The Replacements (formerly 'Dog's Breath' and also by some accounts as 'Dogbreath') in Minneapolis, Minnesota, in 1979 with drummer Chris Mars and Tommy, then just 12 years old; a year later, the band brought in Paul Westerberg on rhythm guitar and vocals. Stinson won acclaim for his lead guitar on the band's first four albums.

In 1985, a long-running power struggle between Stinson and Westerberg reached a breaking point, and Stinson was forced out of the band in the summer of 1986. Though the exact circumstances of the split remain murky, published explanations include Westerberg's commercial aspirations, pressure from [the band's label] Sire Records for more mainstream records, and Stinson's increasing substance abuse problems. "Whether he was thrown out for the way his alleged alcohol problems had destroyed his skills or he left voluntarily due to creative tension is a moot point," according to Prefix Magazine. "What matters is this: Stinson was gone, and with him went much of the band's edge."

With the departure of Stinson, all subsequent recordings by the band were increasingly more pop-oriented, dominated by Westerberg's pop stylings. Stinson's last stint in the band was on the demos for the album Pleased to Meet Me.

Later projects (1986–1994)

Stinson's first band after leaving The Replacements was called Model Prisoner, which broke up in 1988. Model Prisoner's line up consisted of Sonny Vincent on vocals and guitar, Stinson on guitar, Eric Magistad on bass and Jeff Rogers on drums. Other members included Jim Michels and Mike Henderson. The band performed live and they recorded an album at Nicollet Studios (Twin Tone).

Stinson later joined Static Taxi in 1988, who broke up in the summer of 1991, around the same time as the Replacements. Static Taxi recorded extensively although none of the material was released till several years after Stinson's death. Stinson's former bandmates compiled two albums from the band's recordings: Stinson Boulevard (released in 2000) and Closer 2 Normal (released in 2003).

Along with Vincent, Stinson formed the band Shotgun Rationale, and released the single "Time Is Mine" – a remake of the original song by The Testors – in 1991 on Dogmeat Records. The new version of the song, with Stinson on guitar, also featured future Bash & Pop guitarist Steve Brantseg. Stinson also appears on European releases that featured him playing alongside Vincent.

Shotgun Rationale's line up changed constantly. At one point Stinson and Vincent invited Cheetah Chrome (of Dead Boys) to join the band, and Chrome moved to Minnesota to play guitar with them. Vincent called this period, "quite insane for a while... You have to imagine a band consisting of both Bob Stinson and Cheetah Chrome playing and working together.. then add to that I was no angel and you start to get a glimpse of the mercurial energy and intense chaos that we lived in, it didn't last long but it was like living in a constant lightning storm and the sound was the same, tight and concentrated but always exploding over the edge."

Stinson also played with the local band Dog 994 around this time. His last band was The Bleeding Hearts, which he formed with his roommate Mike Leonard. One of their most high-profile performances was opening for Tommy's band Bash & Pop in 1993. His last public performance was playing with Minneapolis Countryswing band Trailer Trash at Lee's Liquor Lounge in late 1994. They performed a version of Lefty Frizzell's "Lil 'Ol Wine Drinker Me".

In 2010, Sonny Vincent compiled all the songs he recorded with Stinson over the years into the album Cow Milking Music, which he released under the name Model Prisoners Featuring Sonny Vincent And Bob Stinson. The album was released on vinyl, with CD included, along with many photos of Stinson from Vincent's archives and a four-page story detailing the history of their collaboration and friendship.

Personal life
In the mid-1980s, Bob married Carleen Krietler.  Stinson and his wife had a son Joey in 1989, who was profoundly disabled. Carleen filed for divorce around 1992. Joey died in 2010 at the age of 21. Joey's obituary, as published on Legacy.com, listed his survivors simply as "his caregivers and grandparents, Anita and Tom Kurth [and] other relatives and friends."

After he left the Replacements, Stinson was never again a full-time musician, and he worked as a cook in various Twin Cities restaurants and hotels.

Death
Stinson died on February 18, 1995. According to the Hennepin County Medical Examiner's Report, he did not die of a drug overdose (as is frequently reported) but rather frequent drug use caused his overall health to diminish, resulting in organ failure. His body was found in his Uptown, Minneapolis apartment, with an unused insulin syringe next to it. His obituary appeared in the print edition of The New York Times on February 24, 1995.

Notes and references

1959 births
1995 deaths
Musicians from Minneapolis
American rock guitarists
American male guitarists
The Replacements (band) members
Drug-related deaths in Minnesota
20th-century American guitarists
Guitarists from Minnesota
People from Waconia, Minnesota
20th-century American male musicians